Richard Alan Cash, M.D., M.P.H. (born June 9, 1941) is an American global health researcher, public health physician, and internist.  He is a Senior Lecturer in International Health at the Harvard T.H. Chan School of Public Health in Boston. 

He is an alumnus of the University of Wisconsin–Madison (B.S., 1963). New York University School of Medicine (M.D., 1966), and Johns Hopkins School of Hygiene and Public Health (MPH, 1973).

Cash began his international career over 40 years ago when he was assigned by NIAID of the NIH to the Pakistan-SEATO Cholera Research Laboratory (CRL) in Dhaka, East Pakistan (now the ICDDR,B in Dhaka, Bangladesh).  While there, he and his colleagues developed and conducted the first clinical trials of oral rehydration therapy (ORT) in adult and pediatric cholera patients and patients with other infectious causes of diarrhea.  This technology matches the volume of fluid losses from dehydration patients with the volume they consume so that the fluid replacement packets greatly reduce or completely replace IV therapy (particularly where it is not feasible or unavailable), which was then the only current treatment for cholera.  Discoveries in ORT have been estimated to have saved over 50 million lives worldwide. World Health Organization (WHO) estimates are that at least 60 million children have been spared painful deaths because of ORT.  They also conducted the first field trials of ORT, the first community-based trials of ORT, and the first use of amino acids (glycine) as an additional substrate.  In the late 1970s, Cash worked with BRAC (presently the world's largest NGO in terms of programs and personnel) on their OTEP (Oral Therapy Extension Programme), which taught over 13 million mothers and caregivers how to prepare and use ORT in the home using the "pinch and scoop" method.

It is estimated by WHO researchers that, each year, around 500 million packs of the oral rehydration solution are used in more than 60 developing countries, saving over 60 million lives around the world.  For demonstrating how inexpensive and simple-to-use oral rehydration therapy (ORT) could treat cholera and other diarrheal diseases, then by promoting in the developing world customized applications of oral rehydration therapy (ORT) developed by Cash and David R. Nalin (at Merck in Vaccine Development from 1983 to 2002), Cash, David Nalin, and Dilip Mahalanabis became joint recipients of the 2006 Prince Mahidol Award in public health for "exemplary contributions in the field of public health" and for their contributions "to the application of the oral rehydration solution in the treatment of severe diarrhea worldwide, including Thailand.

On November 8, 2011, Cash was presented with the 2011 James F. and Sarah T. Fries Foundation Prize for Improving Health at the Centers for Disease Control and Prevention for his leadership in the development and dissemination of Oral Rehydration Therapy as a practical treatment for cholera and other diarrheal diseases that has saved the lives of at least 60 million children worldwide.

Contributions to ethics 
Cash has lectured internationally and authored or co-authored a number of published papers on research ethics and teaches a Harvard course and had long directed (until 2009) a summer intensive workshop on those issues.  He won continued NIH funding for a series of courses on research ethics in medical and health research done in resource-poor nations that touch on over a dozen issues listed on the public course's website.  The use of case method teaching has been a critical element of all his courses.  Many of the currently-used ethics case studies, the course outlines, many readings, and other course materials are available on that site.  After the breakup of the Soviet Union, Cash served (beginning in 2003) with the Russian Academy of Sciences project on development of bioethics capacity in the Commonwealth of Independent States.

Contributions to public health
Richard A. Cash explored contrasts within and between nations in health research ethics as a PI (Principal Investigator) of a training grant from the National Institutes of Health on "Ethical Issues in International Health Research" at HSPH.  For eleven years, as Director of the Program on Ethical Issues in International Health Research and in line with his deep commitment to capacity building in growing nations, he has conducted training workshops based on this research in at HSPH, and in 18 nations in South America, Africa, India, and the Middle East, covering issues of informed consent, confidentiality, conflict of interest, investigator responsibilities to study populations, research in resource poor environments, and the development of ethical review committees.  He has also overseen the training of 20 Fellows from Asia, and he has conducted over 30 workshops on research ethics in 12 nations.

Current public appearances
Richard Cash is interviewed intermittently (often in remote meetings) to comment on the legacy of work he has done in the Middle East, India, and Himalayas.

Accolades

 1994 - Special Citation - 25th Anniversary of the development of Oral Rehydration Therapy (ORT) ICDDRB/Government of Bangladesh
 2006 - 2006 Prince Mahidol Award, received in January 2007 in Bangkok
 2007 - Solomon A. Berson Medical Alumni Achievement Award, New York University School of Medicine
 2008 - Distinguished Alumni Award, New York University
 2011 - 2011 Fries Prize for Improving Health
 2018 - '50 Years of ORT: Cashing in on the Poor Man's Gatorade' - Symposium celebrating the development of ORT and the contributions of Richard Cash and David Nalin, November 19, 2018, sponsored by the Department of Global Health and Population, Harvard Global Health Institute, and Harvard T.H. Chan School of Public Health, Boston, MA.

Books and publications 
Dr. Richard A. Cash has published over 120 peer-reviewed academic papers, spanning his work over 50 years.  Some highlights include:

 Oral maintenance therapy for cholera in adults. Nalin DR, Cash RA, Islam R, Molla M, Phillips RA.  Lancet. 1968 Aug 17;2(7564):370-3.
This paper in The Lancet is the original report of Dr. Nalin and colleagues’ work with ORT.
 Oral or nasogastric maintenance therapy in pediatric cholera patients. Nalin DR, Cash RA. J Pediatr. 1971 Feb;78(2):355-8.
This paper describes the use of ORT in pediatric patients.
 Cash, R., Wikler, D., Saxena, A., Capron, A. Casebook on Ethical Issues in International Health Research, Geneva: World Health Organization, 2009, 2010.
Translated into five other languages, including Arabic, Chinese, English, French, Russian, and Spanish.  ; second edition forthcoming.   (NLM classification: W 20.5).

Major professional service
 1995–1996 - President, Child Health Foundation, Columbia, MD
 1993–1997 - Board Member, Child Health Foundation, Columbia, MD
 1982–1984 - Chair, International Health Section, American Public Health Association

Professional Societies (past and present)
 American Public Health Association
 American Academy for the Advancement of Science
 Global Health Council
 International Epidemiological Association
 International Health Society
 Massachusetts Medical Society
 National Council for International Health
 Royal Society of Tropical Medicine and Hygiene
 Society for Epidemiological Research

Editorial boards
 1997–present - Member, Editorial Board, Archives of Medical Research
 1987–present - Member, Editorial Board, Community Health Education
 Dhananjay Kattul is head of J P Morgan India

Timeline
 1941 - Richard A. Cash born in Milwaukee, Wisconsin
 1959-1962 - University of Wisconsin (Madison), BA (pre-med), 1959 [accelerated; 3-year degree]
 1962-1966 - New York University School of Medicine, MD (1966)
 1966 (Fall) - Rheumatic Disease Unit, Northern General Hospital, Edinburgh, Scotland
 1966-1967 - Intern (Medical Internship), Bellevue Hospital, New York, New York
 1960s - Work as a young clinician interest in global health at the Pakistan-SEATO Cholera Research Laboratory (CRL) in Dhaka
 1967 - Richard Cash co-discovers that oral therapy can rehydrate cholera patients.  Collaborates with David Nalin to develop trial protocol to confirm discovery success.
 1967-1970 - Senior Assistant Surgeon General, US Public Health Research Fellow, Cholera Research Laboratory, National Institute of Allergy and Infectious Diseases of the National Institutes of Health assigned to CRL, Dhaka, Bangladesh.
 1970-1971 - Junior Assistant Resident, Department of Medicine, University of Maryland Hospital, Baltimore, MD
 1971-1973 - Fellow in Infectious Diseases, Department of Medicine, University of Maryland Hospital, Baltimore, MD
 1972-1973 - Johns Hopkins School of Hygiene and Public Health, MPH (1973)
 1973-1976 - Assistant Professor, University of Maryland - Department of Medicine
 1975-1976 - Assistant Professor, University of Maryland - Department of Social and Preventive Medicine
 1975 - The World Health Organization (WHO) and the United Nations Children's Fund (UNICEF) agreed to promote a single, orally administered solution of oral rehydration salts to prevent dehydration caused by diarrhea.
 1976 - Lecturer, Department of International Health, Johns Hopkins School of Hygiene and Public Health
 1977-2000 - Fellow, Harvard Institute for International Development, Cambridge, MA
 1979-1989 - Lecturer, Department of Tropical Public Health, Harvard School of Public Health, Boston, MA
 1981-1990 - Director, Office of International Health, Harvard School of Public Health, Boston, MA
 1990-2000 - Co-director, Health Office, Harvard Institute for International Development, Cambridge, MA* 1998 - NIH Grant to develop ethics course in healthcare research among vulnerable populations in resource poor areas of the developing world.
 1990-2002 - Lecturer on International Health, Department of Population and International Health, Harvard School of Public Health, Boston, MA
 1994 - Special Citation - 25th Anniversary of the development of Oral Rehydration Therapy (ORT) ICDDRB/Government of Bangladesh
 1998–present - Visiting professor, Achutha Menon Centre, Sree Chitra Tirunal Institute for Medical Sciences and Technology, Thiruvananthapuram, Kerala, India
 1998-2001 - Principal Investigator, Ethical Issues in International Health Research, Harvard School of Public Health, Boston, MA
 1999 - First "Ethical Issues in International Health Research" course offered at HSPH.
 2000-2006 - Principal Investigator, International Fellows Program in Ethical Issues in International Health Research, Harvard School of Public Health, Boston, MA
 2001–present - Director, Program on Ethical Issues in International Health Research, Harvard School of Public Health, Boston, MA
 2002-2008 - International Fellowship in Health Research Ethics (September 19, 2002 - December 31, 2008) - sponsored by NIH/FIC
 2002-2008 - Senior Lecturer on International Health, Department of Population and International Health (department name change in mid-2008), Harvard School of Public Health, Boston, MA
 2003-2005 - Ethics in Health Research in China: Capacity Development (September 30, 2003 - August 31, 2005) - sponsored by NIH/NHLBI
 2003–present - Member, International Advisory Committee, James P. Grant School of Public Health, BRAC University, Dhaka, Bangladesh
 2004 - Began working at HSPH on Ethical Issues in Global Health Research summer intensive course with Daniel I. Wikler, previously Senior Bioethicist at WHO.
 2005 - Visiting professor, James P. Grant School of Public Health, BRAC University, Dhaka, Bangladesh
 2007 - Cash received the Mahidol Medal from His Royal Highness the King of Thailand, presented at a ceremony at the Chakri Throne Hall in Bangkok, Thailand.
 2007 -  Solomon A. Berson Medical Alumni Achievement Award,New York University School of Medicine
 2008 - Distinguished Alumni Award, New York University
 2008–present - Senior Lecturer on International Health, Department of Global Health and Population (department name change in mid-2008), Harvard School of Public Health, how the Harvard T.H. Chan School of Public Health, Boston, MA
 2011 - Awarded the 2011 Fries Prize for Improving Health

External links
 "Cholera: A Not-So-Simple Solution"
 HSPH Faculty Profile
 Ethical Issues in Global Health Research summer intensive course at HSPH
 Link to ScienceHeroes.com
 Link to Cash’s biography as recipient of the Prince Mahidol Award
 Against the Odds – Making a difference in global health – A Simple Solution
 Woodward, Billy. "David Nalin-Over 50 Million Lives Saved." Scientists Greater Than Einstein. Fresno: Quill Driver Books, 2009
 Harvard Catalyst Profile page for Richard Alan Cash, MD
 10 Questions with Richard Cash - interview with Harvard Chan School basic degree candidates
 Harvard edX Profile page for Richard Alan Cash, MD

Further reading
 Scientists Greater than Einstein: The Biggest Lifesavers of the Twentieth Century (Hardcover) by Billy Woodward (Author, Fresno: Quill Driver Books, 2009
 The Lessons of Oral Rehydration Therapy: The co-discoverer of a simple solution to a global killer passes all he has learned to public health's next generation, Karin Kiewra, Harvard Public Health Review, 2007.

References

American public health doctors
American ethicists
Johns Hopkins Bloomberg School of Public Health alumni
New York University Grossman School of Medicine alumni
University of Wisconsin–Madison alumni
People from Boston
People from Cambridge, Massachusetts
People from Madison, Wisconsin
Living people
1941 births
Harvard School of Public Health faculty
Harvard Institute for International Development